Choklap Nilsang is a retired professional footballer from Thailand. He played as a forward.

External links
 

1987 births
Living people
Choklap Nilsang
Association football forwards
Choklap Nilsang
Choklap Nilsang